Kashima Station is the name of multiple train stations in Japan.

 Kashima Station (Fukushima) - (鹿島駅) in Fukushima Prefecture
 Kashima Station (Osaka) - (加島駅) in Osaka Prefecture

See also
 Hizen-Kashima Station, on the Nagasaki Main Line in Kashima, Saga